The Principality of the Pindus is a name given to describe a self-declared Aromanian political entity in the territory of Greece. In 1941, the territory of Greece was occupied by Italy, Germany and Bulgaria during World War II. At that time, Alcibiades Diamandi, an Aromanian residing in Samarina who had earlier been the lead of the Samarina Republic, was active with an organization called in later literature with the name of the Roman Legion. As part of the activity of the organization in the areas of mainly Thessaly (and Epirus, and West Macedonia), it was mentioned as an intention of Diamandi to create a semi-independent entity by the name "Principality of the Pindus" or "Independent State of Pindos" or "Canton". The Roman Legion was never able to assert itself over the Aromanians whom it supposedly represented, nor over the local population until its de facto disbandment in 1943 due to the activity of the Greek Resistance and the Italian capitulation, leaving them without real support from the German command. In other sources, no name is assigned to the events of 1917 in the Pindus.

Background
Since Romania's formation in 1859, it tried to win influence over the Aromanian (and also the Megleno-Romanian) population of the Ottoman Empire. In the 1860s, it funded the activity of Apostolos Margaritis who founded Romanian schools in the Ottoman territories of Epirus and Macedonia since the Aromanian language has much in common with the Romanian language. Romania, with the support of Austria-Hungary, succeeded in the acceptance of the Aromanians as a separate millet with the decree (irade) of 22 May 1905 by Sultan Abdulhamid, so the Ullah Millet ("Vlach Millet", for the Aromanians) could have their own churches and schools. This was a diplomatic success of Romania in European Turkey in the last part of the 19th century.

Romania then funded the construction and operation of many schools in the wider region of Macedonia and Epirus. These schools have continued their operation even when some of the territories of the region of Macedonia and Thrace passed to Greek authority in 1912. Their financing by Romania continued in 1913 with the agreement of the then Prime Minister Eleftherios Venizelos. In such Romanian schools, there was a coordinated effort to promote the idea of Romanian identity among Aromanians. Graduates of these schools who wanted to continue their education usually went to educational institutions in Romania.

In 1917, a short-lived polity, which has been described as the "Samarina Republic" posteriorly, was declared in 1917 during World War I, though it would be disestablished on the same year.

History

The Aromanians were part of the projects for the dismemberment of Greece set up by the Italians. When the 11th Army occupied the areas in 1941, their commanders received orders by Palazzo Chigi (the seat of the Italian Ministry of Foreign Affairs at the time) to survey each village recording their ethnicity and its attitude towards the occupiers, finding that most Aromanians absorbed and assimilated into the Greek community with the exception of some groups who were recorded as anti-Bulgarian, anti-Greek, pro-Italian and pro-Romanian. A pre-war dossier for the Italian government on the subject of the Aromanians promoted the idea that they were descendants from the Ancient Romans and that the Aromanians had taken shelter in the Pindus Mountains against barbarian invasions, to be used at the appropriate moment.

After the fall of Greece to the Germans in spring 1941 and the division of the country among the Axis powers, Alcibiades Diamandi created a collaborationist organisation known as the Roman Legion, with the support of the Italian occupation authorities and promoted the idea of an Aromanian canton or semi-independent state, called several decades later by the name "Principality of Pindus" that would encompass northwestern Greece. Diamandi also met the Greek collaborationist Prime Minister, Georgios Tsolakoglou, but Tsolakoglou refused to accommodate his demands. In reality Italian "military authorities refused to permit any form of self-administration by the Aromanians in the awareness that their irredentist aspirations, or appeals for annexation to Italy, were a masquerade by a minority movement seeking political and economic revenge".

From mid-1942 on, the armed Greek Resistance also made its presence felt, fighting against the Italians and their collaborators and the leader of the Roman Legion, Diamandi, left for Romania in 1942, to be followed by his second in command and successor Nicolaos Matussis in 1943.

Whatever authority the Roman Legion exercised, it practically ceased to exist after the Italian capitulation in September 1943, when the control of Central Greece was taken over by the German army.

See also
 Samarina Republic

References

Sources
 Arseniou Lazaros, Η Θεσσαλία στην Αντίσταση
 Andreanu, José, Los secretos del Balkan
 Iatropoulos, Dimitri, Balkan Heraldry
 Toso, Fiorenzo, Frammenti d'Europa
 Zambounis, Michael, Kings and Princes of Greece, Athens 2001
 Papakonstantinou Michael, Το Χρονικό της μεγάλης νύχτας (The chronicle of big night)
 Divani, Lena, Το θνησιγενές πριγκιπάτο της Πίνδου. Γιατί δεν ανταποκρίθηκαν οι Κουτσόβλαχοι της Ελλάδας, στην Ιταλο-ρουμανική προπαγάνδα.
 Thornberry, Patrick and Miranda Bruce-Mitford, World Directory of Minorities. St. James Press 1990, page 131.
 Koliopoulos, Giannēs S. (a.k.a. John S. Koliopoulos), Plundered Loyalties: Axis Occupation and Civil Strife in Greek West Macedonia. C. Hurst & Co, 1990. page 86 ff.
 Poulto, Hugh, Who Are the Macedonians? C. Hurst & Co, 1995. page 111.
After the War Was Over: Reconstructing the Family, Nation, and State in Greece By Mark Mazower
 Kalimniou, Dean, Alkiviadis Diamandi di Samarina (in Neos Kosmos English edition, Melbourne, 2006)
 Seidl-Bonitz-Hochegger, Zeitschrift für Niederösterreichischen Gymnasien XIV.

External links
 A nemlétezők lázadása
 Open University of Calalonia: Le valaque/aromoune-aroumane en Grèce
 Η φωνή της γης

History of the Aromanians
Politics of the Aromanians
Aromanian nationalism
History of Epirus
Proposed countries
States and territories established in 1941
States and territories disestablished in 1943
Greece in World War II
Greece–Romania relations
Greece–Italy relations
Separatism in Greece
Pindus
Aromanians in Greece